The economy of Singapore is a highly developed free-market economy with dirigiste characteristics. Singapore's economy has been previously ranked as the most open in the world, the joint 4th-least corrupt, and the most pro-business. Singapore has low tax-rates and the second-highest per-capita GDP in the world in terms of purchasing power parity (PPP). The Asia-Pacific Economic Cooperation (APEC) is headquartered in Singapore.

Alongside the business-friendly reputation for global and local privately held companies and public companies, various national state-owned enterprises play a substantial role in Singapore's economy.  The sovereign wealth fund Temasek Holdings holds majority stakes in several of the nation's largest bellwether companies, such as Singapore Airlines, SingTel, ST Engineering and MediaCorp.  With regards to foreign direct investment (FDI), the Singaporean economy is a major FDI outflow-financier in the world.  In addition, throughout its history, Singapore has benefited from the large inward flows of FDI from global investors, financial institutions and multinational corporations (MNCs) due to its highly attractive investment climate along with a stable and conducive political environment throughout its modern years. 

Singapore relies on an extended concept of intermediary trade to entrepôt trade, by purchasing raw goods and refining them for re-export in order to sustain its high levels of export-oriented industrialization, such as in the wafer-fabrication industry and in oil refining.  Singapore has a strategic port which makes it more competitive than many of its neighbours in carrying out such entrepôt activities. Singapore's trade-to-GDP ratio is among the highest in the world, as of 2020 the ratio was 320%. The Port of Singapore is the second-busiest in the world by cargo tonnage and is the busiest transshipment port in the world. 

Singapore is also a regional, continental and global hub for the management and operations of various MNCs, because of its strategic location in close proximity with other Asia-Pacific markets, along with its advanced connectivity and infrastructure (airline hub and maritime port with a diverse array of destinations, Gigabit fiber-optic communications, efficient road transport and public transport) and its immigration policies in welcoming global talent. In addition, Singapore is a popular international tourist destination for various types of tourism (Business tourism, MICE (Meetings, Incentives, Conferences, Exhibitions) tourism, Medical tourism, Urban tourism).

Singapore's economy is often referred to as a "miracle" due to its rapid transformation from a developing country to a developed, high-income economy in a relatively short period of time. This transformation took place in the second half of the 20th century under the leadership of Prime Minister Lee Kuan Yew and his government. One of the key factors contributing to Singapore's economic miracle was its strategic location, which made it an ideal hub for international trade and commerce. 

The country's main exports include electronics, chemicals and services. Singapore is the regional hub for wealth management. Water is scarce in Singapore and a sizeable percentage of water is imported from Malaysia, therefore it is defined as a precious resource. 

Small and medium-sized enterprises (SMEs) are the backbone of the Singapore's economic landscape. SMEs contribute 43% of Singapore's GDP (S$428 bil) and employ 70% of Singapore's total workforce of 3.35 million.

Singapore has limited arable land, meaning that Singapore is heavily reliant on agrotechnology parks (particularly vertical hydroponic farms) for agricultural production. As a result, Singapore imports 90% of its food supply and has a wide variety of supplier countries in order to achieve its food security; Singapore is ranked as among the most food secure in the world. 

Apart from its strategic location at the cross-roads of trade between the East and the West, Singapore has little to no natural resources, hence human resources is a pivotal issue for the health of the Singaporean economy; the services and manufacturing sectors of the economy are heavily reliant on a highly-educated and highly-skilled 'Professional, Managerial, Executive and Technical' (PMET) workforce composed of residents and expatriates. The economy of Singapore ranked 2nd overall in the Scientific American Biotechnology ranking in 2014, with the featuring of Biopolis.

To preserve its international standing and to further its economic prosperity in the 21st century, Singapore has taken measures to promote innovation, to encourage entrepreneurship and to retrain its workforce. The Ministry of Manpower (MoM) has the prime responsibility for setting, adjusting, and enforcing immigration rules for foreign workers, in order to achieve the dual mandate of maximum employment of the local resident population and maximum economic growth for the nation. Approximately 29% of the total population within Singapore are non-resident foreigners, including 255,800 foreign domestic workers (FDWs) who operate in Singapore.

Economic statistics
The following table shows the main economic indicators in 1980–2021 (with IMF staff estimates in 2022–2027). Inflation below 5% is in green.

History

British colonization
In 1819, Stamford Raffles, at the time Lieutenant-Governor of Bencoolen, established a trading post in Singapore. Raffles had been searching for a new settlement that could be used as an outpost of the British Empire. He left Calcutta and set out to explore much of South-East Asia. At the time, the Dutch Empire and British Empire were close economic rivals. Colonization enabled both parties to gain vast control of resources from civilizations whose economic might was not as advanced. Raffles was looking for a new settlement to replace Malacca that could provide a key economic advantage over the Dutch Empire. The former was handed over to the Dutch during the Treaty of Vienna. Raffles found Singapore to be a perfect location, sitting just of the edge of the Straights of Malacca, nowadays one of the most important shipping lanes in the world. As well, the territory had key economic resources which would benefit the British. There was abundant timber and fresh water, and a natural deep water harbor which would be beneficial for the British fleet. He arrived at the mouth of the Singapore River, where there was a small Malay settlement. At the time  Accompanied by William Farquhar, Raffles met with Temenggong Abdul Rahman, the leader of the settlement, to negotiate the right to establish a trading post on the island, under the British Empire. The island was ruled by the Sultan of Johor, Tengku Rahman, who was a heavily influenced by the Dutch and the Bugis. However, the Sultanate was weakened by factional division within his people and Temenggong Abdul Rahman and his officials were loyal to Rahman's elder brother Tengku Hussein (or Tengku Long) who was living in exile in Riau. With the Temenggong's help, Raffles managed to smuggle Hussein back into Singapore. He offered to recognize Hussein as the rightful Sultan of Johor and provide him with a yearly payment; in return, Hussein would grant the British the right to establish a trading post on Singapore. On 6 February 1819 Raffles successfully arranged for the territory to be incorporated into the British Empire as an aforementioned trading post. Much of the wealth accumulated early within the region was to be accredited to it hosting one of the major seaport hubs.

Trade expansion
On 17 November 1869, the Suez Canal opens, connecting the Mediterranean Sea to the Red Sea. This allowed for an decrease in travel time, which resulted in a rise in trade volume. The nation saw a $32 million rise just a year after its opening.

Trade volume reached $105 million Straits dollars in 1879, during which entrepot trade was the main source of income and trade alone accounted for more than one-third of GDP.

Independence 
In the 1950s, the region saw social unrest which resulted in colonial powers deciding to relinquish some decision making. With spurs of race riots the colonial powers sought to empower and establish a formidable local government. With most of the unrest resulting from high unemployment, the local government was directed to solve this issue. The Economic Development Board was formed to empower the Singapore government in establishing, developing, and financing industrial undertakings.

In 1955, a Singapore local legislative Assembly with 25 out of 35 members elected was formed.

Upon independence from Malaysia in 1965, Singapore faced a small domestic market, and high levels of unemployment and poverty. 70 percent of Singapore's households lived in badly overcrowded conditions, and a third of its people squatted in slums on the city fringes. Unemployment averaged 14 percent, GDP per capita was US$516, and half of the population was illiterate.

Industrialisation boom and change
After Lee Kuan Yew was elected, he oversaw significant economic reforms to the country. Structural change and machinery propelled the economy during his tenure. Singapore was a small and densely populated nation, with very few natural resources and little space to grow outwards. Recognizing this, Lee identified that the key advantage that Singapore held was its human capital, and its ability to provide highly educated citizens capable of competing in global industry and trade. On 1 August 1961, the Singapore Government established the Economic Development Board to spearhead an investment drive, and make Singapore an attractive destination for foreign investment. FDI inflows increased greatly over the following decades, and by 2001 foreign companies accounted for 75% of manufactured output and 85% of manufactured exports. Meanwhile, Singapore's savings and investment rates rose among the highest levels in the world, while household consumption and wage shares of GDP fell among the lowest. The beginning of Lee's tenure was marked with success and from 1965–1973, annual growth of real GDP was 12.7%. He directed spending to repair and improve infrastructure. This effort spurred economic productivity and put in place the foundations needed to build up basic industry. As of 2019, Singapore's infrastructure is ranked the best in terms of quality, with a score of 95.4 out of 100. The period from 1973-1979 marked a struggle for Singapore as they pivoted away from basic infrastructure spending and moved towards more sustainable economic progress. The 1973 oil crisis raised government awareness of issues such as economic concentration. It forced the government to hold new forum to discuss ways of adapting the countries economy to economic change. GDP growth during this time was slightly lower than the preceding years, at 8.5% annually. However, unemployment was virtually 0%, and most of the population had experienced great strides in productivity. The government highlighted a focus in technology and education to be the new wave of economic gain. In addition, they identified financial services as a key area in which Singapore could diversify and attract new growth. During this time, the government invested heavily in its budding financial services industry. It managed to minimize inflation and provide workers with the proper equipment and machinery to sustain growth.

Recent history

Growth in the service sector
As a result of this investment drive, Singapore's capital stock increased 33 times by 1992, and achieved a tenfold increase in the capital-labour ratio. Living standards steadily rose, with more families moving from a lower-income status to middle-income security with increased household incomes.

In 1987, Lee claimed that (based on the government's home ownership criterion) 80% of Singaporeans could now be considered to be members of the middle-class. Under Lee, Singapore had both low inflation and unemployment. However, much unlike the economic policies of Greece and the rest of Europe, Singapore followed a policy of individualising the social safety net. This led to a higher than average savings rate and a very sustainable economy in the long run. Without a burdensome welfare state or its likeliness, Singapore has developed a very self-reliant and skilled workforce well versed for a global economy.

The 1990s posed a great question for Singapore, as to how they would reinvent their economy. The 1990s emergence of efficient manufacturing firms in southeast Asia challenge the nation with such a small labor force and land restrictions. Friedrich noted how " it would be "unlikely to expand beyond the current 25% share of the economy," when regarding manufacturing firms. Despite struggling in the manufacturing sector Singapore thrived in global finance, trading, and was an industrial hub for international trade.

Singapore's economic strategy produced real growth averaging 8.0% from 1960 to 1999. Since the nations independence in 1965 Singapore GDP has amassed an average of a 9.5% increase. The economy picked up in 1999 under Goh Chok Tong, the Prime Minister of Singapore, after the regional financial crisis, with a growth rate of 5.4%, followed by 9.9% for 2000. However, the economic slowdown in the United States, Japan and the European Union, as well as the worldwide electronics slump, had reduced the estimated economic growth in 2001 to a negative 2.0%.

The economy expanded by 2.2% the following year, and by 1.1% in 2003 when Singapore was affected by the SARS outbreak. Subsequently, a major turnaround occurred in 2004 allowed it to make a significant recovery of 8.3% growth in Singapore, although the actual growth fell short of the target growth for the year more than half with only 2.5%. In 2005, economic growth was 6.4%; and in 2006, 7.9%.

It was apparent that Singapore would also struggle as a result of the global financial crisis given its status as a financial services hub. Some market commentators doubted the economy's ability to cope with the effects of the crisis. In the end the economy grew in 2009 by 3.1% and in 2010, the nation saw a 15.2% growth rate.

As of 8 June 2013, Singapore's unemployment rate is around 1.9% and the country's economy has a lowered growth rate, with a rate of 1.8% on a quarter-by-quarter basis—compared to 14.8% in 2010.

2015 and 2016 saw a downturn for the nation as GDP growth shrunk to just 2 percent. Despite growth diminishing, the nation has yet to post negative growth rates which are a positive sign. During the same period of diminishing economic growth. Unemployment and inflation have also decreased.

As of 2017 Singapore GDP sits at $323.907 billion.

Singapore is expected to experience an economic slowdown in 2019, with GDP growth slowing to 1.9% from 3.1% in 2018, due to tariff hikes from the United States and China.

During the initial months of the COVID-19 pandemic, on 26 March 2020, Singapore's Ministry of Trade and Industry said it believed that the economy would contract by between 1% and 4% in 2020. This was after the economy shrank 2.2% in the first quarter of 2020 from the same quarter in 2019. On 26 May, MTI said that it was revising down its expectation for the Singapore economy in 2020 to shrink by 4% to 7%. Economists had to downgrade their numbers from previously, and some suggested that the economic recovery could take some time. In response to the economic pressure, Moody's temporarily downgraded the Singapore banking sector that year from "stable" outlook to a "negative" outlook.

It was estimated by the economist Chua Hak Bin, the Singapore circuit breaker measures in response to the pandemic, beginning on 7 April could impact the economy to the tune of S$10 billion. With the lockdown imposed on construction workers, there were concerns that there could be delays in construction projects of up to six months. Senior Minister of State for Trade and Industry Chee Hong Tat announced that some 3,800 companies had closed in April 2020, only slightly higher than the 3,700 reported on average for the same month in the past 5 years. Though he warned that this would likely rise in the coming months. Despite this only small increase in companies shutting down, the number of companies starting up had declined by about a third from the average April since 2015.

State enterprise and investment

The public sector is used both as an investor and as a catalyst for economic development and innovation. The government of Singapore has two sovereign wealth funds, Temasek Holdings and GIC Private Limited, which are used to manage the country's reserves. Initially the state's role was oriented more toward managing industries for economic development, but in recent decades the objectives of Singapore's sovereign wealth funds have shifted to a commercial basis.

Government-linked corporations play a substantial role in Singapore's domestic economy.  As of November 2011, the top six Singapore-listed GLCs accounted for about 17 percent of total capitalization of the Singapore Exchange (SGX). These fully and partially state-owned enterprises operate on a commercial basis and are granted no competitive advantage over privately owned enterprises. State ownership is prominent in strategic sectors of the economy, including telecommunications, media, public transportation, defence, port, airport operations as well as banking, shipping, airline, infrastructure and real estate.

As of 2014, Temasek holds S$69 billion of assets in Singapore, accounting for 7% of the total capitalization of Singapore-listed companies. In 2017, GSK shifted its Asian Headquarters to Singapore.

All figures in billions of Singapore dollars.

Sectors
To maintain its competitive position despite rising wages, the government seeks to promote higher value-added activities in the manufacturing and services sectors. It also has opened, or is in the process of opening, the financial services, telecommunications, and power generation and retailing sectors up to foreign service providers and greater competition. The government has also attempted some measures including wage restraint measures and release of unused buildings in an effort to control rising commercial rents with the view to lowering the cost of doing business in Singapore when central business district office rents tripled in 2006.

Banking
Singapore is considered a global financial hub by many leading financial analysts, economists and politicians, with Singapore banks offering world-class corporate bank account facilities. In the 2020 Global Financial Centers Index, Singapore was ranked as having the sixth most competitive financial center in the world, and fourth most competitive in Asia. These include multiple currencies, internet banking, telephone banking, checking accounts, savings accounts, debit and credit cards, fixed term deposits and wealth management services.

Singapore has also attracted assets formerly held in Swiss banks for several reasons, including new taxes imposed on Swiss accounts and a weakening of Swiss bank secrecy. Credit Suisse, the second largest Swiss bank, moved its head of international private banking to Singapore in 2005. For this, the country has also been dubbed the "Switzerland of Asia".

Biotechnology

Singapore has been aggressively developing its biotechnology industry. Hundred of millions of dollars were invested into the sector to build up infrastructure, fund research and development and to recruit top international scientists to Singapore. Leading drug makers, such as GlaxoSmithKline (GSK), Pfizer and Merck & Co., have set up plants in Singapore.  In 2006 GSK invested another S$300 million to build another plant to produce paediatric vaccines, its first such facility in Asia. Pharmaceuticals now account for more than 8% of the country's manufacturing production. In 2022, the biopharma industry of Singapore accounted for manufacturing output of USD 18 billion a year, a value that had tripled during two decades.

Energy and infrastructure

Singapore is the pricing centre and leading oil trading hub in Asia. The oil industry makes up 5% of Singapore's GDP, with Singapore being one of the top three export refining centres in the world. In 2007, it exported 68.1 million tonnes of oil. The oil industry has led to the promotion of the chemical industry as well as oil and gas equipment manufacturing. Singapore has 70 per cent of the world market for both jack-up rigs and for the conversion of Floating Production Storage Offloading units. It has 20 per cent of the world market for ship repair, and in 2008 the marine and offshore industry employed almost 70,000 workers.

Singapore has limited potential for renewable energy mainly due to its small surface area; solar power holds the greatest potential. The government set a target of generating solar power to cover 350,000 households in 2030 that would equal to 4% of the country's electricity demand in 2020. As a financial hub, Singapore can play an important role in attracting investment in renewable energy in the entire ASEAN region.

Real estate

The Singapore government also owns 90 percent of the country's land, as well as housing in which 80 percent of the population lives.

In July 2022, a report by Savills revealed that Singapore tied with New York City in recording the highest rental growth rate for luxury homes globally.

Tourism 

Tourism plays an important role in the economy of Singapore. Singapore ranks among the most visited cities in the world.

Trade, investment and aid

Singapore's total trade in 2014 amounted to S$982 billion. Despite its small size, Singapore is currently the fifteenth-largest trading partner of the United States. In 2014, Singapore's imports totaled $464 billion, and exports totalled $519 billion. Malaysia was Singapore's main import source, as well as its largest export market, absorbing 18% of Singapore's exports, with the United States close behind. However, it is worth noting that there were efforts by some vegetable suppliers from Malaysia to try and smuggle food in if they do not meet food safety standards.

Malaysia is Singapore's biggest trading partner, with bilateral trade totalling roughly 91 billion US dollars in 2012, accounting for over a fifth of total trade within ASEAN. Singapore's trade with major trading partners such as Malaysia, China, Indonesia and South Korea increased in 2012, while trade with EU27, United States, Hong Kong and Japan decreased in 2012. Since 2009, the value of exports exceeds imports for Singapore's trade with China. In comparison, the value of imports exceeds exports for Singapore's trade with the US since 2006.

Re-exports accounted for 43% of Singapore's total sales to other countries in 2000. Singapore's principal exports are electronic components, refined petroleum, gold, computers, and packaged medications. Singapore's main imports are electronic components, refined petroleum, crude petroleum, gold, and computers.

Trade in Singapore has benefited from the extensive network of trade agreements Singapore has passed. According to Healy Consultants, Singapore has free trade access to the entirety of the ASEAN network, with import duty reduced when dealing with Indonesia, Malaysia, the Philippines, Thailand, Brunei, Burma, Cambodia, Laos and Vietnam.

The Singapore Economic Development Board (EDB) continues to attract investment funds on a large-scale for the country despite the city's relatively high-cost operating environment. The US leads in foreign investment, accounting for 40% of new commitments to the manufacturing sector in 2000. As of 1999, cumulative investment for manufacturing and services by American companies in Singapore reached approximately $20 billion (total assets). The bulk of US investment is in electronics manufacturing, oil refining and storage, and the chemical industry. More than 1,500 US firms operate in Singapore.

Singapore's largely corruption-free government, skilled workforce, and advanced and efficient infrastructure have attracted investments from more than 3,000 multinational corporations (MNCs) from the United States, Japan, and Europe. Foreign firms are found in almost all sectors of the economy. MNCs account for more than two-thirds of manufacturing output and direct export sales, although certain services sectors remain dominated by government-linked corporations.

The government also has encouraged firms to invest outside Singapore, with the country's total direct investments abroad reaching $39 billion by the end of 1998. The People's Republic of China was the top destination, accounting for 14% of total overseas investments, followed by Malaysia (10%), Hong Kong (9%), Indonesia (8%) and US (4%). The rapidly growing economy of India, especially the high technology sector, is becoming an expanding source of foreign investment for Singapore. The United States provides no bilateral aid to Singapore, but the US appears keen to improve bilateral trade and signed the US-Singapore Free Trade Agreement. Singapore corporate tax is 17 per cent.

International trade agreements

Singapore workforce
In 2000, Singapore had a workforce of about 2.2 million. With limited access to natural resources, Singapore had been forced to invest in its people. The country has the largest proficiency of English language speakers in Asia, making it an attractive place for multinational corporations. Singapore has come a long way from where it once stood. In the 1970s according to Tilak Abeysinghe  "2.4 percent of the labor force were degree holders" By 1990 the number rose to just 6.3%. In 2013 the number of labor force who hold degrees has amassed to 31%. The nations directive toward high skilled labor jobs, has promoted both growth and education to the region. The National Trades Union Congress (NTUC), the sole trade union federation, which has a symbiotic relationship with the ruling party, accounts for almost 99% of total organised labour. Government policy and pro-activity rather than labour legislation controls general labour and trade union matters.

The Employment Act offers little protection to white-collar workers due to an income threshold. The Industrial Arbitration Court handles labour-management disputes that cannot be resolved informally through the Ministry of Manpower. The Singapore Government has stressed the importance of co-operation between unions, management and government (tripartism), as well as the early resolution of disputes. There has been only one strike in the past 15 years.

Singapore has enjoyed virtually full employment for long periods of time. Amid an economic slump, the unemployment rate rose to 4.0% by the end of 2001, from 2.4% early in the year. Unemployment has since declined and as of 2012 the unemployment rate stands at 1.9%.

While the Singapore government has taken a stance against minimum wage and unemployment benefit schemes, in 2007 the government introduced a Workfare Income Supplement (WIS) scheme to supplement wages of low-skilled workers. To support employers in hiring older Singaporean workers, Special Employment Credit (SEC) was introduced in 2011. It was first enhanced in 2012 to provide employers with support in hiring older Singaporean workers and Persons with Disabilities (PWDs). It helped the employers to cope with costs associated with the increase in Central Provident Fund (CPF) contribution rates for older workers. The 5-year SEC scheme was further extended to additional 3 years, up to 2019 to encourage employers to voluntarily re-employ older workers aged 65 and above.

The Singapore Government and the NTUC have tried a range of programs to increase lagging productivity and boost the labour force participation rates of women and older workers. However, labour shortages persist in the service sector and in many low-skilled positions in the construction and electronics industries. Foreign workers help make up this shortfall. In 2000, there were about 600,000 foreign workers in Singapore, constituting 27% of the total work force. As a result, wages are relatively suppressed or do not rise for all workers. To have some controls, the government imposes a foreign worker levy payable by employers for low end workers like domestic help and construction workers. In 2012, the Ministry of Trade and Industry (MTI) reported that Singapore should continue to fine-tune the calibration of its inflow of foreigners as the country continues to face an ageing population and a shrinking workforce. Singapore Parliament accepted the recommendations by its Economic Strategies Committee (ESC) for the optimal ratio of the level of immigration and foreign manpower for both high and low skilled workers. The Government recognises that the current overall foreign workforce should complement the local resident workforce and not replace the Singaporean Core concept, and helps companies greatly as they raise productivity through business restructuring and workforce retraining; raise resident labour force participation rate.

Poverty and economic inequality
Singapore is one of the world's wealthiest countries per capita, but its Gini coefficient is high in comparison to developed countries. Statistics on income inequality are published by the Singapore Department of Statistics. Without taking taxes and social transfers into account, Singapore's gini coefficient puts the country in the medium range. Nevertherless, the country remains on the "very high" category on the inequality-adjusted human development index (IHDI), a ranking similar to the Human Development Index (HDI), but with inequality also accounted for.

In October 2018, Oxfam ranked Singapore 149 out of 157 in its Commitment to Reducing Inequality Index 2018, placing it among the bottom ten of the countries in the index, which ranks countries based on efforts to reduce economic inequality. In its report, Oxfam accused Singapore of practices which encouraged "harmful tax practices", not having a universal minimum wage (apart from janitors and security guards), and poor performance on labour rights. The government responded to the report by claiming that it was more important to look at "real outcomes" such as Singapore's high home ownership, health, education, and employment, rather than public spending or tax rates, also saying that the report "assumes that high taxation and high public expenditure reflects commitment to combating inequality".

The government provides social support through a variety of social assistance schemes. The Ministry of Social and Family Development runs ComCare, a program which provides income support for low-income citizen households through various schemes for short-to-medium term assistance, long-term assistance, child support, and urgent financial needs. The Community Development Councils also run various local assistance schemes within their districts. The Ministry of Manpower runs a Silver Support Scheme which provides additional financial support for low-income elderly with no family support. Meanwhile, the Ministry of Health also runs MediFund to assist families that have difficulty paying for medical bills despite government subsidies and other health financing schemes. In addition, the National Council of Social Service coordinates a range of 450 non-government voluntary welfare organisations to provide social services, while raising funds through The Community Chest of Singapore.

Today, low and middle-income groups now receive 2.5 times the public subsidies they did ten years ago.

Public finance
Government spending in Singapore has risen since the start of the global financial crisis, from around 15% of GDP in 2008 to 17% in 2012. The government's total expenditure as a percentage of GDP ranks among the lowest internationally and allows for a competitive tax regime. Singapore is required under its constitution to keep a balanced budget over each term of government. Singapore government debt is issued for investment purposes, not to fund expenditure.

Personal income taxes in Singapore range from 0% to 22% for incomes above S$320,000. There are no capital gains or inheritance taxes in Singapore. Singapore's corporate tax rate is 17% with exemptions and incentives for smaller businesses. Singapore has a single-tier corporate income tax system, which means there is no double-taxation for shareholders.

Singapore introduced Goods and Services Tax (GST) with an initial rate of 3% on 1 April 1994, increasing government's revenue by S$1.6 billion (US$1b, €800m) and establishing government finances. The taxable GST was increased to 4% in 2003, to 5% in 2004, and to 7% in 2007.

The Singapore government owns two investment companies, GIC Private Limited and Temasek Holdings, which manage Singapore's reserves. Both operate as commercial investment holding companies independently of the Singapore government, but Prime Minister Lee Hsien Loong and his wife Ho Ching serve as chairman and CEO of these corporations respectively. While GIC invests abroad, Temasek holds 31% of its portfolio in Singapore, holding majority stakes in several of the nation's largest companies, such as Singapore Airlines, SingTel, ST Engineering and MediaCorp. As of 2014, Temasek holds S$69 billion of assets in Singapore, accounting for 7% of the total capitalisation of Singapore-listed companies.

In April 2013, the country was recognised as an increasingly popular tax haven for the wealthy due to the low tax rate on personal income, a full tax exemption on income that is generated outside of Singapore and 69 double taxation treaties that can minimise both withholding tax and capital gains tax. Australian millionaire retailer Brett Blundy, with an estimated personal wealth worth AU$835 million, and multi-billionaire Facebook co-founder Eduardo Saverin are two examples of wealthy individuals who have settled in Singapore (Blundy in 2013 and Saverin in 2012). Additionally, Australian mining magnate Gina Rinehart owns property in Singapore and American investor Jim Rogers moved to Singapore in 2007—Rogers has identified the 21st century as an era in which Asia will dominate and wishes for his two daughters to learn Mandarin as a key outcome of the relocation. Chinese Media TV celebrities Jet Li and Gong Li have also taken up naturalised Singapore citizenship.

Monetary policy
The Monetary Authority of Singapore (MAS) is Singapore's central bank and financial regulatory authority. Its current chairman is Tharman Shanmugaratnam (May 2011–present). It administers the various statutes pertaining to money, banking, insurance, securities and the financial sector in general, as well as currency issuance. The MAS has been given powers to act as a banker to and financial agent of the Government. It has also been entrusted to promote monetary stability, and credit and exchange policies conducive to the growth of the economy.

Unlike many other central banks such as Federal Reserve System, European Central Bank or Bank of England, MAS does not regulate the monetary system via interest rates to influence the liquidity in the system. Instead, it chooses to do it via the foreign exchange mechanism, which it has been doing since 1981. In doing so it manages the Singapore dollar versus a number of currencies that they do not reveal publicly – a Singapore dollar nominal effective exchange rate (S$ NEER). It carries this out by intervening in the SGD market as well as other operations in the money market. The MAS reviews its policy stance less frequently than most central banks, in a cycle that is around every 6 months. In some circumstances, such as during the COVID-19 pandemic MAS can change the date of its twice yearly meeting.

In May 2022, six major banks agreed to pay $64.5 million to resolve antitrust allegations that they worked together to rig benchmark Singapore interest rates. The banks involved included Credit Suisse AG, Deutsche Bank AG, The Hongkong and Shanghai Banking Corporation Limited, ING Bank N.V., Citibank N.A. and JPMorgan Chase & Co.

Property policy
To dampen property speculation, the government imposed Additional Buyer Stamp Duty (ABSD) starting in December 2011. It was subsequently raised in January 2013 and then again in July 2018. Currently for Singapore citizens buying their first property, there is no ABSD. For their second property onwards, they pay up to 15% ABSD. For foreigners the ABSD rate is 20% no matter if it is the first property. And for entities it is 25%. At the same time they raised the ABSD in 2018, the MAS tightened rules on housing loans, by limiting the loan tenure and reducing the Loan-to-Value ratio.

Mergers and acquisitions 

16,156 mergers and acquisitions deals have been conducted in Singapore so far, which accumulated to a total value of 850. bil. USD. Since 1985 there has been a constant upward trend, disrupted only in 2002 and 2009. The most active year in terms of numbers (926) and value (78. bil. USD) has been 2017, so there is currently an all-time high. In general inbound and outbound deals in Singapore are nearly equally distributed.

Here is a list of the top 10 deals with Singaporean participation inbound or outbound:

Facts and figures
Percentage of economic growth:
1.7% (2016)

Industrial production growth rate:
1% (2016 est.)

Electricity – production by source:
fossil fuel:
95.3%
hydro:
0%
nuclear:
0%
other:
3.9% (2014 est.)

Electricity – consumption:
47.5 TWh (2016)

Electricity – exports:
0 kWh (2007)

Electricity – imports:
0 kWh (2007)

Agriculture – products:
rubber, copra, fruit, vegetables; poultry, eggs, fish, orchids, ornamental fish

Currency:
1 Singapore dollar (S$ or SGD) = 100 cents

Exchange rates:

International rankings

See also
 Four Asian Tigers
 5 C's of Singapore
 Biopolis
 Dual economy
 Bamboo network
 Immigrant workers in Singapore
 Singapore Workplace Safety and Health Conference
 Singapore and the World Bank

Notes

References

External links

 Statistics Singapore
 Singapore Department of Statistics
 Monetary Authority of Singapore

 
Singapore